Grand Prince is a 2018 South Korean television series starring Yoon Shi-yoon, Jin Se-yeon and Joo Sang-wook. The series aired on TV Chosun from March 3 to May 6, 2018, on Saturdays and Sundays at 22:50 (KST).

The drama achieved a rating of 5.627% for its finale, becoming the 
fourth-highest-rated TV Chosun drama behind Love (ft. Marriage and Divorce), Queen: Love and War, and Kingmaker: The Change of Destiny.

Synopsis
A drama about two princes who enter into a rivalry due to their love for the same  woman. It is loosely based on the true stories of Grand Prince Anpyeong and King Sejo.

Cast

Main
 Yoon Shi-yoon as Lee Hwi, Prince Eun Sung (Grand Prince Anpyeong)
  as young Lee Hwi
 The younger brother of Lee Kang and third in line to the throne. He is considered as the most eligible bachelor in Joseon Dynasty.
 Jin Se-yeon as Sung Ja-hyun
 A beautiful and elegant lady who is gentle and passionate. She gets caught up in a love triangle between two princes, but her heart only belongs to Lee Hwi. 
 Joo Sang-wook as Lee Kang, Prince Jin Yang (King Sejo)
 Choi Kwon-soo as young Lee Kang
 An ambitious and charismatic prince. Lee Hwi's older brother and second in line to the throne. He dreams of becoming the next King of Joseon.

Supporting

People around Lee Hwi
 Nam Ji-hyun as Roo Shi-gae
Lee Hwi's bodyguard. A woman who grew up in the wild and has strong survival instincts. 
 Jo Yun-seo as Jung Seol-hwa 
She has a one-sided love for Lee Hwi.
 Choi Sung-jae  as Kim Kwan
Lee Hwi's bodyguard.
 Bang Jae-ho as Park Gi-teuk
Lee Hwi's eunuch. 
 Yang Mi-kyung as Queen Dowager Shim (Queen Soheon motive)

People around Sung Ja-hyun
 Lee Ki-young as Sung Wok
 Ja-hyun's father. 
 Kim Mi-kyung as Ahn Juk-san 
Ja-hyun's mother. 
 Han Jae-suk as Sung Deuk-shik 
 Ja-hyun's brother. He has a secret crush on Ggeut-dan.
 Moon Ji-in as Ggeut-dan
Sung Ja-hyun's maid. Despite being born in a distinguished family, she decides to become a maid to escape the demands of her family.
Jeon Min-seo as Ahn Dan-bi
Sung Ja-hyun's little cousin, she was the member of Queen's Selection.

People around Lee Kang
 Son Byong-ho as Lee Je, Prince Yang An (Prince Yangnyeong)
The elder brother of King Sejong the Great. Supporter of Lee Kang. 
 Ryu Hyo-young as Yoon Na-gyeom (Queen Jeonghui)
 Lee Kang's wife. A lady who desires power over love.
 Choo Soo-hyun as Cho Yo-kyung (Cho Yo-gaeng)
A woman who joined forces with Lee Kang to win over Lee Hwi's love.

Others
 Song Jae-hee as King (King Munjong)
 Jang In-sub as Doh Jeong-gook	
 Oh Seung-ah as Royal Noble Consort Hyo of the Jungjeon Kim clan (Queen Hyeondeok)
 Kim Gwan's sister, and the King's concubine.
 Kim Joon-ui as Lee Myung, Prince Seung Pyung (King Danjong)
 Jung Yoon-seok as Lee Myung after 10 years
 Queen Dowager Shim's grandson. He is the Crown Prince until the King's death. As the new King even though he was little, his grandma would act as guardian for him to lead the country until he was an adult. While Prince Eun Sung is exiled to another island, he was forced to abdicate by his uncle Prince Jin Yang.
 Shin Yi as Court Lady Jang
 The princes' caretaker. 
 Lee Chae-eun as Poem	
 Kim Bo-bae
 Na-gyeom's sidekick.

Production
The first script reading was held on November 23, 2017, at TV Chosun Studio.

Original soundtrack

Part 1

Part 2

Part 3

Ratings

Awards and nominations

Notes

References

External links
  
 

Korean-language television shows
2018 South Korean television series debuts
2018 South Korean television series endings
South Korean historical television series
South Korean romance television series
TV Chosun television dramas
Television series set in the Joseon dynasty